William Nathan Boyd (born 28 August 1968), professionally known as Billy Boyd, is a Scottish actor and musician. He played Peregrin "Pippin" Took in Peter Jackson's epic film trilogy The Lord of the Rings (2001–2003), Barret Bonden in Master and Commander: The Far Side of the World (2003) and Glen and Glenda (later G.G. Valentine) in the Child's Play film Seed of Chucky (2004) and second season of the television series Chucky (2022).

Early life
Boyd was born in Glasgow, Scotland, to William and Mary Boyd, who both died a year apart when Boyd was in his early teens.  He worked as a bookbinder for six years before pursuing an acting career. After graduating from the Royal Scottish Academy of Music and Drama, he went on to perform with St Andrews Repertory and the Traverse Theatre.

Career

Acting
Boyd started his career appearing in Taggart (1996), The Soldier's Leap (1998), and Urban Ghost Story (1998). He also appeared in the 7:84 Theatre Company Scotland production of Caledonia Dreaming by David Greig in 1997. His breakthrough, and most notable acting role, was Peregrin "Pippin" Took in The Lord of the Rings trilogy, from 2001 to 2003. Boyd wrote the melody for and sang the song "The Edge of Night", which was featured in The Lord of the Rings: The Return of the King. The song was later used over the trailer for The Hobbit: The Battle of the Five Armies (2014), the final film in the Hobbit trilogy. Boyd also wrote and performed the song "The Last Goodbye", which is played during the ending credits of the film.

In 2004, he starred as Glen and Glenda, Chucky's (Brad Dourif) and Tiffany's (Jennifer Tilly) offsprings in the Child's Play film Seed of Chucky. He has also made a cameo appearance in the popular Scottish comedy Still Game in the second episode of the first series.

As well as being a screen actor, he also appears on the stage. Boyd has been in several plays; including San Diego and The Ballad of Crazy Paola. He performed at the Dundee Repertory Theatre in the role of Davie in Sunshine on Leith, as well as in Long Hong Jimmy, in which he was the lead actor. He also starred (2007) as Richard MacDuff in the BBC Radio adaptation of the book: Dirk Gently′s Holistic Detective Agency written by Douglas Adams.

In 2011, his feature film Glenn, the Flying Robot was shown in the Dawn Breakers International Film Festival, and was followed by a Netflix release. In June 2012, he appeared on stage as the voice of the guide in The Hitchhiker's Guide to the Galaxy live radio show. In 2013, Boyd played Banquo in Shakespeare's Macbeth, at the Shakespeare's Globe alongside Joseph Millson and Samantha Spiro.

Boyd together with fellow Lord of the Rings castmates Sean Astin, Sean Bean, Orlando Bloom, Ian McKellen, Dominic Monaghan, Viggo Mortensen, Miranda Otto, John Rhys-Davies, Andy Serkis, Liv Tyler, Karl Urban, and Elijah Wood, plus writer Philippa Boyens and director Peter Jackson on 31 May 2020 joined Josh Gad's YouTube series Reunited Apart which reunites the cast of popular movies through video-conferencing, and promotes donations to non-profit charities.

In 2022, he reprised his Child's Play role in the second season finale of the television series Chucky, titled "Chucky Actually", as a merged incarnation of Glen and Glenda Tilly, known as G.G. Valentine.

Music
Boyd fronts a band called Beecake. The band was named after a time when Boyd's Lord of the Rings co-star Dominic Monaghan sent a picture of a cake covered in bees. Other members of the band included Paul Burke, Billy Johnston, and Rick Martin.

Boyd made a guest appearance on Viggo Mortensen's 2003 album Pandemoniumfromamerica, where he played the bass on two songs, as well as drums on another.

In June 2010, Beecake released an album Soul Swimming. As well as topping some of the international MySpace charts, the band was awarded VisitScotland's award for Best Live Act at the Tartan Clef Music Awards. The award was created by VisitScotland to celebrate Scotland's live music scene and Glasgow's new title of UNESCO City of Music.

Beecake released the EP Please Stay on 4 June 2012. The music video for the song "Please Stay" from the EP was released to coincide with the release of the EP. The song's music video was directed by Michael Ferns, a graduate from the RSAMD where Boyd himself graduated. The group released their second album Blue Sky Paradise in December 2012. The band released a second EP titled Just B in July 2013.

In 2014, Boyd wrote and performed the song "The Last Goodbye", which was played over the ending credits of the movie The Hobbit: The Battle of the Five Armies.

Personal life
Boyd is an avid surfer and spent his free time surfing in New Zealand during the production for The Lord of the Rings. He also holds a Grade 7 in foil fencing. He trained in martial arts at the Krauseworld Academy in Glasgow under brothers Steve Krause and Mike Krause where he achieved Phase 4 rank in both Jeet Kune Do and Filipino Kali. He topped a list of the 100 Most Eligible Men in Scotland in 2002.

He owns a house in Glasgow with his wife, Alison McKinnon. The couple had their first child, a boy named Jack William Boyd, on 26 April 2006. He and McKinnon were married in a ceremony with 30 guests at Oran Mor in Glasgow's West End on 29 December 2010. The wedding was attended by castmates Elijah Wood and Dominic Monaghan. A reception was held afterwards for about 130 guests.

Boyd has a tattoo of the Elvish word for "nine" written with the Tengwar script, a reference to his involvement in The Lord of the Rings, and the fact that his character was one of the nine members of the Fellowship of the Ring. The other actors of "The Fellowship" (Elijah Wood, Sean Astin, Sean Bean, Ian McKellen, Dominic Monaghan, Viggo Mortensen, and Orlando Bloom) got the same tattoo with the exception of John Rhys-Davies whose stunt double got the tattoo instead.

He remains close with The Lord of the Rings co-star Dominic Monaghan. Monaghan revealed in an interview for the national breakfast television show GMTV that he continues to see Boyd on a regular basis, as he is "essentially, kind of, godfather to his kid." Boyd and Monaghan co-host the podcast ‘The Friendship Onionʼ together.

Boyd is one of the patrons of Scottish Youth Theatre, Scotland's National Theatre 'for and by' young people. He is also the patron of the National Boys' Choir of Scotland.

Holidays in Scotland
In 2008, Boyd fronted VisitScotland's Perfect Day Campaign, and talked of his love of surfing in Scotland, particularly in Machrihanish near the town of Campbeltown in Kintyre in the west coast of Scotland, and Pease Bay and Coldingham Bay on Scotland's east coast. In an interview about the campaign with The Scotsman on 28 July 2008, he said: "I don't really do much promotional stuff but felt that with this one I could be honest... I'm very proud of where I come from and I get very excited if a friend comes over and I can show them around."

Filmography

Film

Television

Video games

Awards and nominations
Broadcast Film Critics Association Award
 2004: Won, "Best Acting Ensemble" – The Lord of the Rings: The Return of the King (shared with cast)

DVD Exclusive Awards
 2003: Nominated, "Best Audio Commentary" – The Lord of the Rings: The Two Towers (shared with cast)

Empire Awards
 2002: Nominated, "Best Debut" – The Lord of the Rings: The Fellowship of the Ring (shared with Dominic Monaghan)

National Board of Review of Motion Pictures
 2003: Won, "Best Acting by an Ensemble" – The Lord of the Rings: The Return of the King (shared with cast)

Online Film Critics Society
 2003: Won, "Best Ensemble" – The Lord of the Rings: The Two Towers (shared with cast)

Screen Actors Guild Awards
 2002: Nominated, "Outstanding Performance by the Cast of a Theatrical Motion Picture" – The Lord of the Rings: The Fellowship of the Ring (shared with cast)
 2003: Nominated, "Outstanding Performance by the Cast of a Theatrical Motion Picture" – The Lord of the Rings: The Two Towers (shared with cast)
 2004: Won, "Outstanding Performance by the Cast of a Theatrical Motion Picture" – The Lord of the Rings: The Return of the King (shared with cast)

References

External links

 Official website
 

1968 births
Living people
Outstanding Performance by a Cast in a Motion Picture Screen Actors Guild Award winners
Male actors from Glasgow
Alumni of the Royal Conservatoire of Scotland
Scottish male film actors
Scottish male stage actors
Scottish stand-up comedians
Scottish male television actors
Musicians from Glasgow
20th-century Scottish male actors
21st-century Scottish male actors